Roedtan is a small town in the Limpopo province, South Africa, set in the midst of the Springbok Flats. Roedtan has a rail road station  from Polokwane. At the road junction to Roedtan stands a monument to the battle of Moordrift in 1854 when 33 white people were killed in a skirmish with the local tribe headed by Makapane. The cave, Makapansgat, is now known to record early hominid occupation (1,500,000 years ago) and is a national monument. The Springbok Flats is a reminder that great herds of Springbok once populated the plain, which was also frequented by lions and other wild animals.

References

Populated places in the Modimolle–Mookgophong Local Municipality